Hurricane Diana was a deadly tropical cyclone which struck Mexico in August 1990. The fourth named storm and second hurricane of the season, Diana developed from a tropical wave in the southwestern Caribbean on August 4. Forming as a tropical depression, the system brushed Honduras before intensifying into a tropical storm the following day. Continuing to gradually strengthen, Diana made its first landfall in Mexico's Yucatán Peninsula as a strong tropical storm late on August 5. The cyclone weakened slightly due to land interaction, before emerging into the Bay of Campeche on August 6. Once over water, warm sea surface temperatures allowed Diana to quickly become a hurricane and later peak as a Category 2 on the Saffir–Simpson hurricane scale on August 7. Rapid weakening ensued once the storm moved over the high terrain of Mexico, with Diana diminishing to a tropical depression roughly 24 hours after moving onshore. The cyclone later emerged into the Gulf of California on August 9 shortly before dissipating. The remnant disturbance was monitored until losing its identity over Arizona on August 14.

Diana left relatively minor impacts in the Yucatán Peninsula. Some locations observed tropical storm-force sustained winds and gusts, while heavy rains left street flooding in the Chetumal area. Along the Gulf Coast of Mexico, the hurricane produced torrential rains exceeding  in some places. Numerous roads and railways were either washed out or blocked by debris, cutting communication with several communities. In all, Diana killed 139 people in Mexico and resulted in approximately $90.7 million (1990 USD) in damage. The remnant disturbance caused street flooding in Arizona.

Meteorological history

Hurricane Diana originated from a tropical wave which emerged into the Atlantic Ocean from the west coast of Africa on July 27. Unfavorable conditions initially prohibited tropical cyclogenesis, with the wave remaining disorganized until reaching the eastern Caribbean Sea. The system entered the Caribbean Sea through the southern Windward Islands, where barometric pressures fell slightly, decreasing by 3.5 mbar (hPa; 0.1 inHg) in 24 hours. Upper-level air data from the Lesser Antilles indicated that the tropical wave was associated with an upper-level anticyclone. The first reconnaissance aircraft flight into the wave indicated no low-level circulation, but a relatively large and increasing amount of thunderstorm activity. The system continued to have a large amount of associated convection while passing over the Netherlands Antilles, as indicated by satellite images and surface observations. However, this was based on surface observations, and the formation of a tropical cyclone operationally remained unconfirmed until another reconnaissance aircraft flight later that day.

The depression initially moved to the northwest under the influence of a mid-level trough. Around 00:00 UTC on August 5, about 24 hours after developing, the cyclone intensified into a tropical storm while offshore northeastern Honduras; the National Hurricane Center assigned the name Diana to the system. Diana would subsequently strengthen further, with winds reaching  before the storm made landfall near Felipe Carrillo Puerto, Quintana Roo, around 20:00 UTC later that day. Upon entering the Bay of Campeche, Diana began moving nearly due west as a result of a weakening trough of low pressure. With conditions being more favorable in the Bay of Campeche, Diana quickly intensified, becoming a hurricane around 06:00 UTC on August 7. At 19:00 UTC on August 7, just one hour after attaining peak intensity, Diana made landfall in Tamiahua, Tamaulipas, at the same intensity.

Moving inland, Diana rapidly weakened over the high terrain of Mexico, quickly deteriorating from a low-end Category 2 hurricane to a strong tropical storm by 00:00 UTC on August 8. The system continued westward and weakened to a tropical depression roughly 12 hours later while centered near Mexico City. The weakening tropical depression turned west-northwestward over central Mexico and emerged into the Pacific Ocean on August 9, before dissipating as a tropical cyclone over the Gulf of California. The remnants of Diana curved northward around the eastern periphery of an upper-cyclone and tracked through the Gulf of California. Convection flared up before the remnant disturbance moved ashore in northwestern Sonora. The remnants of Diana entered Arizona and dissipated by early on August 14.

Preparations

In anticipation of Diana's first landfall, a tropical storm warning was issued on August 5 for Cancún, Mexico, southward to Belize City, Belize, on August 5, including the offshore islands from both nations; a tropical storm warning indicates that tropical storm force winds, are expected within 24 hours. Eleven hours later, the tropical storm warning was extended as far as Carmen, but was discontinued for the entire east coast of Belize. Civil defense officials in Quintana Roo recommended that residents in coastal areas and in homes with weak construction to evacuate. The civil defense also set up emergency shelters in Punta Allen, Punta Herrero, and Xcalak. After Diana made landfall on the Yucatán Peninsula on August 6, all of the tropical storm warnings in place were discontinued.

Diana then threatened the mainland east coast of Mexico. A hurricane watch was issued for Tuxpan to Boca de Jesus Maria at 21:00 UTC on August 6; a hurricane watch notes the possibility of hurricane conditions within 48 hours, such as winds of at least . Early on August 7, the National Hurricane Center anticipated hurricane conditions within 24 hours, and as a result, a hurricane warning was issued for Nautla to Le Pesca. Simultaneously, a tropical storm warning was issued for La Pesca to Boca de Jesus Maria. Later that day, a hurricane warning had been issued for a similar area, stretching from Nautla to Lerdo de Tejada. According to Miguelangel Rebolledo, the captain of the port of Tuxpan, about 300 people fled low-lying areas. State and federal officials prepared 10,000 packages of emergency supplies, food, and medicine and moved them to several locations along the coast. Police and Armed Forces were placed on alert. By 00:00 UTC on August 8, all of the watches and warnings in place were officially discontinued.

Impact

Mexico
Diana also caused heavy rain across the area, though damage is unknown. Due to heavy rainfall, minor street flooding occurred in Chetumal, Quintana Roo.

Rough seas resulted in the closures of the ports at  Coatzacoalcos and Tampico. Heavy rainfall triggered mudslides and flooding, mostly in the east-central portion of Mexico. The Comisión Nacional del Agua noted that at least seven rivers in the lower Pánuco River basin threatened to overflow their banks in the states of Guanajuato, Jalisco, San Luis Potosí, and Tamaulipas. The rainfall caused extensive property damage, destroying numerous houses and leaving 3,500 homeless.

The states of Veracruz, Hidalgo, and Puebla were hardest hit, with over 75,000 people affected by the hurricane. In Poza Rica, high winds toppled trees and electricity poles, which cut off telephone services and electricity supply to the city. Fallen trees and telephone wires also blocked some streets in the area, but the major roads remained open. Farther south, flooding left Federal Highway 185 impassable near Coatzacoalcos for a few days. Approximately 80% of apple, coffee, peach, and pear crops were lost in the municipality of Huayacocotla. In Pánuco, flooding forced more than 2,000 families to flee their homes. Diana caused at least 20 deaths and left 18 people missing in the city. Local crops experienced significant damage, especially cotton, rice, and soybeans.

In Hidalgo, several miners died after their truck plunged into a ravine. The San Juan River overflowed in the town of Huejutla de Reyes, sweeping away hundreds of homes and some people in one neighborhood. Diana also damaged at least 110 schools and 25 public buildings throughout in Hidalgo. Flooding washed out or damaged four federal highways and six state highways. The agricultural industry in Hidalgo, which had not fully recovered from a severe frost in December 1988, experienced significant effects. About  of croplands suffered damage, mainly impacting coffee, rice, and bean crops.
 
Excluding the 56 people still missing by the end of 1990, Diana caused at least 139 deaths and $90.7 million in damage.  However, some sources claim that there were as much as 391 fatalities and losses incurred by the storm totaled to $94.5 million. In addition, it is estimated that Diana injured 25,000 people.

Elsewhere
The remnants of Hurricane Diana eventually moved into the Southwestern United States, bringing heavy rainfall to the region. In Imperial County, California, golf-ball sized hail was reported by the residents, along with rain and lightning, causing brief power outages throughout the county. A police dispatch of Imperial County also noted local flooding, which resulted in traffic disruptions.

In Arizona, the remnants of Diana contributed to record cold temperatures for August in Phoenix. In Maricopa County,  of rain was observed. Several weather-related car accidents occurred, but none were serious. In Apache Junction, police and city officials rushed to close flooded streets, including portions of state highways and underpasses of Interstate 17. Crews were pumping  of water from the underpasses of Interstate 17, but their efforts were futile. A  portion of State Route 87 between Gila River Indian Community and the intersection with State Route 187 was shut down due to flooding. In Sacaton, about two-thirds of the city was inundated with at least  of water.

Aftermath
Following the storm, the Mexican Armed Forces delivered food and basic health care supplies to victims. In addition, there was also a mass vaccination against typhoid. Officials delivered about 8,000 boxes of blankets, clothing, and food in total to the 55 worst impacted communities in Veracruz. The Mexican Army and Civil Defense of Veracruz deployed 36 medical brigades to attend to those injured during the storm. By August 11, 120 families in the Sierra Norte de Puebla region of Puebla had received construction materials to rebuild their homes.

Due to its impact, the name Diana was retired by the World Meteorological Organization in the spring of 1991, and will never be used again for another Atlantic hurricane. It was replaced with Dolly for the 1996 season.

See also

 Other storms named Diana
 List of Category 2 Atlantic hurricanes
 List of tropical cyclones
 List of Atlantic hurricanes
 List of Atlantic–Pacific crossover hurricanes
 Hurricane Debby (1988) – A Category 1 hurricane that impacted similar areas
 Hurricane Gert (1993) – A Category 2 hurricane that impacted similar areas
 Hurricane Stan (2005) – A Category 1 hurricane that impacted similar areas
 Hurricane Karl (2010) – A Category 3 hurricane that impacted similar areas
 Hurricane Franklin (2017) – A Category 1 hurricane that impacted similar areas

References

External links

 NHC Diana report (GIF format)
 HPC Diana Rainfall page

Diana
Diana
Diana
Diana
1990 in Mexico
Diama